Carlos Campano Jiménez (born 15 September 1985) is a former Spanish professional motocross rider, world champion in MX3 class in 2010.

References

External links
 

Living people
1985 births
Spanish motocross riders